Anderson Drew Boyd (born November 18, 1985) is an American director, screenwriter, producer and film editor from Raleigh, North Carolina. He studied filmmaking at the University of North Carolina at Wilmington and is best known for his debut feature film, Well Wishes (2015).

Career 
After leaving Wilmington, North Carolina for Manhattan, Boyd matriculated into then worked for a post-production trade school before hiring into its sister company. His first major screen credit was the Academy Award nominated Winter's Bone (2010), of which he was attributed by director Debra Granik with shaping into a neo-noir, away from observational iterations. During this period he cut scenes for the films Cold Weather (2010) and Up Heartbreak Hill (2011).

He worked as an on-line editor for the Sundance documentaries Joan Rivers: A Piece of Work, The Tillman Story, the SXSW documentary Strange Powers: Stephin Merritt and the Magnetic Fields and subsequently in creative offline editing with the Independent Spirit Award nominated film The History of Future Folk and the Adult Swim television series The Heart, She Holler and Delocated.

Boyd's feature directorial debut, Well Wishes, was a 2013 quarter-finalist of Francis Ford Coppola's American Zoetrope Screenplay Contest before entering production in October 2013. The film was lensed at 65 locations across North Carolina over a period of 29 days with a production budget of only $300,000, qualifying it for the now-defunct North Carolina Film Incentive 25% refund. Boyd won Best Director, Best Screenplay and Best Feature Narrative for the film at the 2015 Williamsburg International Film Festival. He is currently writing a follow-up feature film, an international crime drama concerning 3D printing.

Filmography

Feature films

Short films

References

External links 

Caronova Pictures

1985 births
Living people
Writers from Raleigh, North Carolina
Ravenscroft School alumni
University of North Carolina at Wilmington alumni
American film editors
Film producers from New York (state)
American male screenwriters
Film directors from New York City
Businesspeople from Raleigh, North Carolina
Film directors from North Carolina
Screenwriters from New York (state)
Screenwriters from North Carolina